Computer University, Thaton ( is situated at the fort of the Wondami Hilllock in God village of Thaton Township, Mon State, Myanmar.  The university is administered by the Ministry of Science and Technology (Myanmar).

History 
Government Computer college (Mawlamyaing) was opened on 4 September 2000 in the compound of Government Technical College (Mawlamyaing) in Mawlamyaing. It was later moved next to Mawlamyaing Industrial Zone in Naung Pin Zate Village Tract of Kyaikmaraw Township. On 20 January 2007, it was upgraded to the University level and named as the Computer University, Mawlamyaing. University was moved to Thaton Township on 20 November 2011 and changed the name as the Computer University (Thaton).

Programs
The University offers five-year bachelor's degree programs in computer science and computer technology.

References

External links
 https://www.ucsthaton.com
 http://ucsthn.moe.edu.mm/
 https://nightfury.info

Educational institutions established in 2000
Universities and colleges in Mon State
Technological universities in Myanmar
2000 establishments in Myanmar